The Blues Magoos are an American rock group from The Bronx, a borough of New York City, United States. They were at the forefront of the psychedelic music trend, beginning in 1966. They are best known for the hit song "(We Ain't Got) Nothin' Yet".

History

1964–1971
The band was formed in 1964 as The Trenchcoats.  The original members were Emil "Peppy" Thielhelm  "Peppy" Castro (vocals and guitar), Dennis LePore (lead guitar), Ralph Scala (organ and vocals), Ron Gilbert (bass) and Jon Finnegan (drums). The band made a name for itself in various clubs in Greenwich Village. The band changed its name first to the Bloos Magoos and by 1966 to the Blues Magoos. Mike Esposito joined as lead guitarist and Geoff Daking as drummer.

The band's single "So I'm Wrong and You Are Right" b/w "The People Had No Faces" on Verve Records (both Rick Shorter compositions) did not gain the band much recognition. In late 1966, Mercury Records signed the band to a record deal and the group's debut album, Psychedelic Lollipop, was released shortly thereafter – following the 1966 trend to include the word "psychedelic" on the sleeve (after the 13th Floor Elevators' The Psychedelic Sounds of the 13th Floor Elevators, and The Deep's Psychedelic Moods, both also from 1966). They played often at the Chess Mate Coffeehouse, a mostly folk venue in Detroit owned by Morrie Widenbaum that also hosted bands such as Southbound Freeway and Siegel-Schwall Blues Band.  In a tour of the US in 1967 the Blues Magoos were the opening act, followed by The Who and the headliners Herman's Hermits.

The group's most successful song was "(We Ain't Got) Nothin' Yet," which reached number 5 on the U.S. charts, and number 4 in Canada.

The next single by the Blues Magoos was "There's A Chance We Can Make It". By 1967, they appeared on several network television programs including two Dick Clark–produced series, Where The Action Is and American Bandstand. They also made visits to The Smothers Brothers Comedy Hour, performing "Pipe Dream," and a Kraft Music Hall hosted by Jack Benny. "One by One" was the band's last single to make the charts. The two albums released after Psychedelic Lollipop (Electric Comic Book and Basic Blues Magoos) were not successful. By 1968, the band split up.

The band was signed to ABC Records, but only Castro agreed to continue and started up a revamped Blues Magoos, with Eric Kaz, Richie Dickon, John Leillo and Roger Eaton.  The other Blues Magoos moved to the west coast, enlisted Ted Munda, and released the "Let Your Love Ride" b/w "Who Do You Love" single on Ganim Records in 1969 before replacing Munda with Joey Stec, formerly of The Millennium, and then eventually going their separate ways. Ralph Scala and Joey Stec later played in The Dependables. In 1969, the Castro-led band completed Never Goin' Back To Georgia.  Eaton left the band, and the other Blues Magoos used session musicians for the follow-up Gulf Coast Bound. After two further years the band was dissolved.

1972–present
After a stint with the rock musical Hair and recording with Mercury label mate Exuma (Tony McKay), Peppy Castro formed Barnaby Bye with fellow cast members Bobby and Billy Alessi. The group released two albums on Atlantic Records, Room to Grow (1972) and Touch (1973). In 1981, Castro resurfaced again with the group Balance whose song "Breaking Away" reached No. 22 on the Billboard Hot 100 chart. 

In July 2008, the Blues Magoos with original members Ralph Scala, Castro and Geoff Daking reunited for the first time in years for two concerts, including one with The Zombies at the Fillmore New York at Irving Plaza in New York City. In December 2009 they traveled to Spain for the Purple Weekend festival.

In 2014, The Blues Magoos released their first new album in 43 years, titled Psychedelic Resurrection. The Blues Magoos toured in 2015.

Discography

Albums
Psychedelic Lollipop (1966) (#15 Can.)
Electric Comic Book (1967) (#14 Can.)
Basic Blues Magoos (1968)
Never Goin' Back to Georgia (1969)
Gulf Coast Bound (1970)
Psychedelic Resurrection (2014)

Singles

Re-releases on CD
The original group's output on CD is now complete.  Repertoire Records has released their three albums in deluxe digi-packages with detailed liner notes.  Each CD has bonus tracks which include mono versions of single releases, fan club exclusives, and obscure early recordings.  Additionally, Collectables Records still has the doubled-up Psychedelic Lollipop/Electric Comic Book CD for sale and Mercury's Kaleidoscopic Compendium anthology is still available as well.  The post-1969 group's output has not been released on CD to date. In 2011 Sundazed Records reissued Psychedelic Lollipop and Electric Comic Book on limited edition (1000 copies) vinyl and CD from the first generation Mercury master tapes with greatly improved sound quality compared to earlier reissues.

Line-ups

References

External links
 Official website
 Official band MySpace
 Official 2012 Blues Magoos PSYCHEDELIC RESURRECTION Facebook page
 The Dependables - Cherry Red Records page
 Blues Magoos on classicbands.com
 [ Blues Magoos on allmusic.com]
 

Acid rock music groups
Garage rock groups from New York (state)
Musical groups established in 1964
Psychedelic rock music groups from New York (state)
Mercury Records artists
Musical groups from the Bronx